Leigh Cowlishaw (born 16 December 1970) is an English former footballer and coach. He served as the head coach of the Richmond Kickers from 2000 until 2018.

Career

Coaching
Cowlishaw had been manager of the Kickers since 2000, during which time he coached the team to a Central Conference title in his debut year, two USL2 regular season titles in 2006 and 2007, three US Open Cup quarter final berths in 2001, 2004 and 2007, and two USL Second division championships, in 2006 and 2009. He is a two-time USL2 Coach of the Year nominee, helped guide the organisation to four USL Organization of the Year awards (1995, 2000, 2006 and 2007), the Fair Play Award in 2004, and was named FieldTurf USL2 Coach of the Year in 2006.

On June 26, 2018, Cowlishaw stepped down as the head coach of the Kickers to assume the Director of Soccer role with the club.

References

External links
Richmond Kickers bio

1970 births
Living people
Sportspeople from Burton upon Trent
English footballers
English expatriate footballers
English football managers
Richmond Spiders men's soccer players
Richmond Kickers players
USISL players
USL League Two players
USISL Select League players
A-League (1995–2004) players
USL Second Division players
Expatriate soccer players in the United States
Expatriate soccer managers in the United States
Richmond Spiders men's soccer coaches
Richmond Kickers coaches
Association football midfielders
English expatriate sportspeople in the United States